Super Lap is a time attack race event held in Australia and New Zealand. This may also refer to:
 Time attack, a race event where racers have to beat the best time
 Super Lap Battle, an American time attack race event